Inčukalns Municipality is a municipality in Vidzeme, Latvia. The municipality was formed in 2006 by merging Inčukalns Parish and Vangaži town, the administrative centre being Inčukalns. The population in 2020 was 7,640.

On 1 July 2021, Inčukalns Municipality ceased to exist. Inčukalns Parish was merged into Sigulda Municipality and Vangaži town was merged into Ropaži Municipality.

Inčukalns underground gas storage 

Inčukalns underground gas storage facility, which helps to serve the Baltic States, is located in the municipality. The facility has a storage capacity of 4.47 bcm. The gas is stored around 800 meters underground.

See also 
 Administrative divisions of Latvia (2009)

References 

 
Former municipalities of Latvia